Hajjiabad (also Romanized as Ḩājjīābād and Hājī Ābād) is a village in Rudbar-e Qasran Rural District, Rudbar-e Qasran District, Shemiranat County, Tehran Province, Iran. At the 2006 census, its population was 146, in 45 families.

References 

Populated places in Shemiranat County